The Ministry of Foreign Affairs is the Bahamas government ministry which oversees the foreign relations of Bahamas. The Current foreign affairs minister is the Honourable Darren Henfield, MP (Member of Parliament) for North Abaco.

See also 
 Minister of Foreign Affairs (Bahamas)
 Foreign relations of the Bahamas

External links 
 Ministry of Foreign Affairs

Foreign Affairs
Foreign relations of the Bahamas
Bahamas